Criș may refer to several places:

 Körös, a river called the Criș in Romanian
 Criș, a village in Blăjeni Commune, Hunedoara County
 Criș, a village in Daneș Commune, Mureș County
 Criș (Târnava Mare), a river in Mureș County
 Crișul Alb, a river in western Romania
 Crișul Negru, a river in western Romania
 Crișul Repede, a river in western Romania

See also 
 Crișan (disambiguation)
 Crișana (disambiguation)
 Crișeni (disambiguation)
 Crișuri (disambiguation)
 Crișul Mic River (disambiguation)